Elizabeth Montoya de Sarria (born in 1949) was allegedly an emissary from the Colombian drug-trafficking Cali Cartel to then-Colombian President. Ernesto Samper's 1994 presidential campaign. Her husband, Jesus Amado Sarria Agredo, was convicted of drug trafficking and a former police officer accused of having ties with the cartel.
De Sarria was implicated in accusations of illegal funding to Samper's campaign after tapes of two phone calls between her and Samper and campaign treasurer Santiago Medina were published by the Bogota magazine Semana. Jesus Sarria was later found innocent after further investigation and absolved of all accusations. 

On Feb. 1, 1996, de Sarria was shot 12 times and killed. She was slated to testify against Samper, who was accused of receiving funds from drug cartels. She was later found to be an scapegoat during the famous “Proceso 8000.”  The group Dignity for Colombia claimed the murder.

References

1950 births
1996 deaths
Female murder victims
Assassinated Colombian people